Darryl Hill may refer to:

 Darryl Hill (American football) (Darryl Andre Hill, born 1943), first African-American football player in the Atlantic Coast Conference
 Cappadonna (born 1969), American rapper whose birth name is Darryl Hill
 Darryl Hill (basketball) (born 1982), American former basketball player at St. John's University (New York)
 Darryl Hill (snooker player) (born 1996), Manx professional snooker player

See also 
 Hill (surname)